15th NSFC Awards
January 6, 1981

Best Film: 
 Melvin and Howard 
The 15th National Society of Film Critics Awards, given on 6 January 1981, honored the best filmmaking of 1980.

Winners

Best Picture 
1. Melvin and Howard
2. Raging Bull
2. Every Man for Himself (Sauve qui peut (la vie))

Best Director 
1. Martin Scorsese – Raging Bull
2. Jonathan Demme – Melvin and Howard
3. Jean-Luc Godard – Every Man for Himself (Sauve qui peut (la vie))

Best Actor 
1. Peter O'Toole – The Stunt Man
2. Robert De Niro – Raging Bull
3. Robert Duvall – The Great Santini

Best Actress 
1. Sissy Spacek – Coal Miner's Daughter
2. Mary Tyler Moore – Ordinary People
3. Goldie Hawn – Private Benjamin

Best Supporting Actor 
1. Joe Pesci – Raging Bull
2. Timothy Hutton – Ordinary People
3. Jason Robards – Melvin and Howard

Best Supporting Actress 
1. Mary Steenburgen – Melvin and Howard
2. Debra Winger – Urban Cowboy
3. Cathy Moriarty – Raging Bull

Best Screenplay 
1. Bo Goldman – Melvin and Howard
2. John Sayles – Return of the Secaucus 7
3. Jean Gruault – Mon Oncle d'Amérique

Best Cinematography 
1. Michael Chapman – Raging Bull
2. Freddie Francis – The Elephant Man
3. Ghislain Cloquet and Geoffrey Unsworth – Tess

References

External links
Past Awards

1980
National Society of Film Critics Awards
National Society of Film Critics Awards
National Society of Film Critics Awards